Withermarsh Green is a village in the civil parish of Stoke-by-Nayland, in the Babergh district, in the county of Suffolk, England. It is located near the villages of Stoke-by-Nayland and Shelley. Withermarsh Green has a church called St Edmund's RC Church.

History 
The name "Withermarsh" means 'the quivering marsh' or 'the quaking bog'. Withermarsh was recorded in Ælfflæd's will of 1000-1002 as "Wifærmyrsc" and
"Hwifermirsce". Withermarsh Green was recorded in the Domesday Book as Withermers. Withermarsh may have been called "Wythermerested" in 1327. The Withermarsh family derive their name from Withermarsh.

References

External links 

 http://www.hadleigh.org.uk/content/catholicism.htm

Villages in Suffolk
Stoke-by-Nayland